Louis Stanton Auchincloss (September 27, 1917 – January 26, 2010) was an American lawyer, novelist, historian, and essayist. He is best known as a novelist who parlayed his experiences into books exploring the experiences and psychology of American polite society and old money.  His dry, ironic works of fiction continue the tradition of Henry James and Edith Wharton.  He wrote his novels initially under the name Andrew Lee, the name of an ancestor who cursed any descendant who drank or smoked.

Early life
Born in Lawrence, New York, Auchincloss was the son of Priscilla Dixon (née Stanton) and Joseph Howland Auchincloss. His brother was Howland Auchincloss and his paternal grandfather, John Winthrop Auchincloss, was the brother of Edgar Stirling Auchincloss (father of James C. Auchincloss) and Hugh Dudley Auchincloss (father of Hugh D. Auchincloss, Jr.). He grew up among the privileged people about whom he would write, although, as he put it, "There was never an Auchincloss fortune…each generation of Auchincloss men either made or married its own money".

He attended St. Bernard's School,  Groton School and Yale University, where he was editor of the Yale Literary Magazine. Although he did not complete his undergraduate studies at Yale, he was admitted to and attended law school at the University of Virginia. He graduated in 1941 and was admitted to the New York bar the same year.

Career
Auchincloss was an associate at Sullivan & Cromwell from 1941 to 1951 (with an interruption for war service from 1942 to 1945 in the United States Navy during World War II, which might have inspired his 1947 novel The Indifferent Children).  He applied to join the Naval Reserve as an intelligence specialist on December 4, 1940 and was appointed as a lieutenant on December 1, 1942.

After taking a break to pursue full-time writing, Auchincloss returned to working as a lawyer, first as an associate (1954–58) and then as a partner (1958–86) at Hawkins, Delafield and Wood in New York City as a wills and trusts attorney, while writing at the rate of a book a year.

Literary career
Auchincloss is known for his closely observed portraits of old New York and New England society. Among his books are the multi-generational sagas The House of Five Talents (1960), Portrait in Brownstone (1962), and East Side Story (2004). The Rector of Justin (1964) is the tale of a renowned headmaster of a prep school like the one he attended, Groton School, trying to deal with changing times.

In the early 1980s, Auchincloss produced three novels which were not centered on the New York he knew so well, i.e. The Cat and the King, set in Louis XIV's Versailles, Watchfires, concerned with the American Civil War, and Exit Lady Masham, set in Queen Anne's England. Auchincloss would remain close to New York again, however, in his later fiction writing.

Gore Vidal said of his work: "Of all our novelists, Auchincloss is the only one who tells us how our rulers behave in their banks and their boardrooms, their law offices and their clubs.... Not since Dreiser has an American writer had so much to tell us about the role of money in our lives."

Personal life
In 1957, Auchincloss married Adele Burden Lawrence (1931–1991), the daughter of Florence Irvin (née Burden) Lawrence and Blake Leigh Lawrence. Her grandfather was prominent industrialist James A. Burden Jr. and her great-grandmother was Vanderbilt heiress Emily Thorn (née Vanderbilt) Sloane White. Adele was an artist, environmentalist and later became a deputy administrator of the New York City Parks and Recreation Department. Together they had three children:

 Andrew Sloan Auchincloss, a lawyer who married Tracy Lee Ehrlich in 1999.
 John Winthrop Auchincloss II, a lawyer who married Dr. Tracy Pennoyer, sister of architect Peter Pennoyer (both great-grandchildren of J.P. Morgan Jr.), in 1988.
 Blake Leigh Auchincloss, an architect

He was president and chairman of the Museum of the City of New York and chairman of the City Hall Restoration Committee and was a member of the Century Association and the American Academy of Arts and Letters, where he served as president.

On January 26, 2010, Auchincloss died from complications of a stroke at Lenox Hill Hospital in New York City.

Awards and legacy
Significant collections of Auchincloss's papers reside at the Albert and Shirley Small Special Collections Library at the University of Virginia and at the Beinecke Library at Yale University. In addition, he was the recipient of the following awards and accolades:
National Book Award Finalist (1960, 1961, 1965, 1967)
Member, American Academy of Arts and Letters (1965)
Honorary degree, New York University (Litt.D., 1974)
Honorary degree, Pace University (1979)
President, American Academy of Arts and Letters (19??)
Honorary degree, The University of the South (1986)
Fellow of the American Academy of Arts and Sciences (1997)
"Living Landmark" status (2000), New York Landmarks Conservancy
National Medal of Arts (2005)

Works
Auchincloss wrote more than 60 books.

Novels
The Indifferent Children (1947)
Sybil (1952)
A Law for the Lion (1953)
The Great World and Timothy Colt (1956)
Venus in Sparta (1958)
Pursuit of the Prodigal (1959): National Book Award Finalist
The House of Five Talents (1960): National Book Award Finalist
Portrait in Brownstone (1962)
The Rector of Justin (1964): National Book Award Finalist 
The Embezzler (1966): National Book Award Finalist
A World of Profit (1968)
I Come as a Thief (1972)
The Dark Lady (1977)
The Country Cousin (1978)
The House of the Prophet (1980)
The Cat and the King (1981)
Watchfires (1982)
Exit Lady Masham (1983)
The Book Class (1984)
Honourable Men (1986)
Diary of a Yuppie (1987)
The Golden Calves (1988)
Fellow Passengers: A Novel in Portraits (1989)
The Lady of Situations (1990)
Three Lives (1993)
The Education of Oscar Fairfax (1995)
Her Infinite Variety (2000)
The Scarlet Letters (2003)
East Side Story (2004)
The Headmaster's Dilemma (2007)
Last of the Old Guard (2008)

Short story collections
The Injustice Collectors (1950)
The Romantic Egoists (1954)
Powers of Attorney (1963)
Tales of Manhattan (1967)
Second Chance: Tales of Two Generations (1970)
The Partners (1974)
The Winthrop Covenant (1976)
Narcissa and Other Fables (1982)
Skinny Island: More Tales of Manhattan (1987)
False Gods (1992)
Tales of Yesteryear (1994)
The Collected Stories of Louis Auchincloss (1994)
The Atonement and Other Stories (1997)
The Anniversary and Other Stories (1999)
Manhattan Monologues (2002)
The Young Apollo and Other Stories (2006)
The Friend of Women and Other Stories (2007)

Nonfiction
Reflections of a Jacobite (1961)
Pioneers and Caretakers: A Study of Nine American Women Novelists (1965)
On Sister Carrie (1968)
Motiveless Malignity (1969)
Edith Wharton: A Woman in Her Time (1972)
Richelieu (1972)
A Writer's Capital (1974)
Reading Henry James (1975)
Life, Law, and Letters: Essays and Sketches (1979)
Persons of Consequence: Queen Victoria and Her Circle (1979)
False Dawn: Women in the Age of the Sun King (1985)
The Vanderbilt Era: Profiles of a Gilded Age (1989)
Love without Wings: Some Friendships in Literature and Politics (1991)
The Style's the Man: Reflections on Proust, Fitzgerald, Wharton, Vidal, and Others (1994)
The Man Behind the Book: Literary Profiles (1996)
Woodrow Wilson (Penguin Lives) (2000)
Theodore Roosevelt (The American Presidents Series) (2002)
A Voice from Old New York: A Memoir of My Youth (2010)

Adaptations
Auchincloss's The Great World and Timothy Colt (1956) was adapted for television in an episode of the Climax! series (Season 4, Episode 22; Broadcast 27 March 1958).  Composer Paul Reif adapted Portrait in Brownstone into an opera upon which he was working at the time of his death; it has remained unperformed.

References
Notes

Sources

External links
 Louis Auchincloss – Daily Telegraph obituary
 Louis Auchincloss: Writer who chronicled the lives and times of America's WASP elite, The Independent, 2 February 2010

Louis Auchincloss papers 
Louis Auchincloss Collection. Yale Collection of American Literature, Beinecke Rare Book and Manuscript Library.

Auchincloss family
1917 births
2010 deaths
Fellows of the American Academy of Arts and Sciences
United States National Medal of Arts recipients
Groton School alumni
University of Virginia School of Law alumni
Yale University alumni
New York (state) lawyers
Virginia lawyers
Novelists from New York (state)
Novelists from Virginia
American male essayists
American male novelists
American male poets
American male short story writers
20th-century American male writers
21st-century American male writers
20th-century American essayists
21st-century American essayists
20th-century American novelists
21st-century American novelists
20th-century American short story writers
21st-century American short story writers
Sullivan & Cromwell associates
People from Lawrence, Nassau County, New York
Military personnel from New York (state)
Historians from New York (state)
20th-century American lawyers
Presidents of the American Academy of Arts and Letters